Michel Portal (born 27 November 1935) is a French composer, saxophonist, and clarinetist. He plays both jazz and classical music and is considered to be "one of the architects of modern European jazz".

Early life
Portal was born in Bayonne on 27 November 1935. His family was musical and there were several instruments in his house when he was growing up. His interest in jazz began after hearing it on the radio after World War II. He studied clarinet at the Conservatoire de Paris and conducting with Pierre Dervaux.

Later life and career
Portal "gained experience in light music with the bandleaders Henri Rossotti and (in Spain in 1958) Perez Prado, as well as with the drummer Benny Bennett (1960), Raymond Fonsèque (1963), Aimé Barelli, and, for many years, the singer Claude Nougaro". Portal co-founded the free improvisation group New Phonic Art. During 1969, Portal played on a recording of Karlheinz Stockhausen's Aus den sieben Tagen.

Portal began scoring music for films in the 1980s. He has won the César Award for Best Music Written for a Film three times.

Discography

As leader
 Our Meanings and Our Feelings (Pathe, 1969)
 Alors!!! (Futura, 1970)
 Splendid Yzlment (CBS, 1972)
 A Chateauvallon: No, No But It May Be (Le Chant Du Monde, 1973)
 Sonates Pour Clarinette et Piano, Op. 120 (Harmonia Mundi, 1977)
 Dejarme Solo! (Cy, 1979)
 Arrivederci Le Chouartse (Hat Hut, 1981)
 L'ombre Rouge (Saravah, 1981)
 Men's Land (Label Bleu, 1987)
 Turbulence (Harmonia Mundi, 1987)
 Concerto Pour Clarinette (Harmonia Mundi, 1989)
 Any Way (Label Bleu, 1993)
 Musiques De Cinemas (Label Bleu, 1995)
 Dockings (Label Bleu, 1998)
 Rencontre Duos Pour Clarinette (EMI, 1998)
 Fast Mood (BMG, 1999)
 Burundi (PAO, 2000)
 Minneapolis (Universal, 2000)
 Minneapolis We Insist! (Universal, 2002)
 Concerts (Dreyfus, 2004)
 Birdwatcher (Sunnyside, 2007)
 Bailador (Classics, 2010)
 Radar (Intuition, 2016)
 Eternal Stories (Erato, 2017)
 MP85 (Label Bleu, 2021)

As sideman
With Barbara
 Barbara No. 2 (Philips, 1965)
 Le Soleil Noir (Philips, 1968)
 Barbara Chante Barbara (Philips, 1978)
 L'aigle Noir (Philips, 1981)

With Richard Galliano
 Laurita (Dreyfus, 1995)
 Blow Up (Dreyfus, 1997)
 French Touch (Dreyfus, 1998)
 Concerts Inedits (Dreyfus, 1999)

With Laurent Korcia
 Danses (Naive, 2004)
 Doubles Jeux (Naive, 2006)
 Laurent Korcia (Naive, 2008)

With others
 Susanne Abbuehl, Compass (ECM, 2006)
 Jean-Louis Agobet, Generation Feuermann Ritratto Concertante Phonal (Timpani, 2005)
 Gilbert Amy, Shin Anim Sha Ananim (Erato, 1987)
 Luciano Berio, Musique Vivant Laborintus 2 Per Voci, Strumenti E Registrazione (Arcophon, 1969)
 Michel Beroff, The Five Piano Concertos/Overture On Hebrew Themes (EMI, 1988)
 Claude Bolling, Jazzgang Amadeus Mozart (Philips, 1965)
 Pierre Boulez, Musique Vivante, Diego Masson Domaines (Harmonia Mundi, 1971)
 Michel Colombier, Wings (A&M, 1971)
 Thomas Dutronc, Frenchy (Blue Note, 2020)
 Serge Gainsbourg, Gainsbourg Percussions (Philips, 1964)
 Jef Gilson, Enfin! (L'Echiquier, 1964)
 Jef Gilson, Jef Gilson a Gaveau (SFP, 1965)
 Michel Hausser, Holiday for Vibes and Cembalet (Columbia, 1964)
 Antoine Herve, Road Movie (Nocturne, 2006)
 Andre Hodeir, Anna Livia Plurabelle (Philips, 1966)
 Daniel Humair, 9–11 pm Town Hall (Label Bleu, 1988)
 Daniel Humair, Quatre Fois Trois (Label Bleu, 1997)
 Mauricio Kagel, Exotica (Deutsche Grammophon, 1972)
 Gidon Kremer & Piazzolla, Hommage a Piazzolla (Nonesuch, 1996)
 Sylvain Luc, Joko (Dreyfus, 2006)
 Pierre Michelot, Round About A Bass (Mercury, 1963)
 Ibrahim Maalouf, 10 Ans de Live! (Mi'ster, 2016)
 Sunny Murray, Sunny Murray (Shandar, 1971)
 Claude Nougaro, Claude Nougaro (Philips, 1966)
 Bernard Parmegiani, Pop'eclectic (Plate Lunch, 1999)
 Vincent Peirani, Thrill Box (ACT, 2013)
 Jean-Luc Ponty, Jazz Long Playing (Philips, 1964)
 Jean Luc Ponty, La Sorcellerie a Travers Les Ages/Gravenstein (Communication, 1977)
 Francis Poulenc, Sonatas (EMI, 1973)
 Raimon, Raimon (Fonomusic 1992)
 Raimon, T'Adones Amic...? (Le Chant Du Monde, 1974)
 Pascal Roge, Chamber Music (Decca, 1989)
 Aldo Romano, Il Piacere (Owl, 1979)
 Alan Silva, Seasons (BYG, 1971)
 Jacky Terrasson, Gouache (Universal, 2012)
 Henri Texier, An Indian's Week (Label Bleu, 1993)
 Francois Tusques, Free Jazz (Mouloudji, 1965)
 Vienna Art Orchestra, All That Strauss (TCB, 2000)
 Miroslav Vitous, Remembering Weather Report (ECM, 2009)

References

External links

1935 births
Living people
People from Bayonne
21st-century clarinetists
21st-century French male musicians
21st-century saxophonists
Commandeurs of the Ordre des Arts et des Lettres
Conservatoire de Bordeaux alumni
Conservatoire de Paris alumni
Free improvising musicians
French classical clarinetists
French film score composers
French jazz clarinetists
French jazz saxophonists
French multi-instrumentalists
French male film score composers
French male jazz musicians
Male saxophonists
Label Bleu artists